Daniel R. Chamberlain is an American academic administrator who served as president of Houghton College for 30 years. 

On February 14, 2005, Chamberlain announced his retirement, effective May 2006. He was succeeded by Shirley Mullen. At the time of his retirement he was one of the longest-serving college presidents in the United States.

Education
Chamberlain earned a B.A. from Upland College in 1953, followed by a M.A. from California State University, Los Angeles. He then earned two doctorates, one from University of California, Los Angeles and the other from University of Southern California.

Experience
Western Pilgrim College, 1953–59,
Teacher of English & History,
Academic Dean

Pasadena City Schools, 1959–63,
Teacher of English & History,
Co-Director, Experimental Team Teaching Project

Upland College, 1963–65,
Chairman, Division of Professional Studies,
Teacher of English,
Acting President

State University of New York, 1965–68,
Assistant University Dean for University-Wide Activities

Messiah College, 1968–76,
Dean of the College

Houghton College, 1976–2006,
President

External links
Official website - Houghton College

References

1932 births
Living people
California State University, Los Angeles alumni
UCLA Graduate School of Education and Information Studies alumni
USC Rossier School of Education alumni
State University of New York faculty
Messiah University
Houghton University
Oklahoma Wesleyan University faculty